Mateusz Rudyk  (born 20 July 1995 in Oława) is a Polish track cyclist, who competes in sprinting events. He won the gold medal at the 2016 UEC European Track Championships in the team sprint.

References

External links

1995 births
Living people
Polish male cyclists
Polish track cyclists
People from Oława
European Games competitors for Poland
Cyclists at the 2019 European Games
Cyclists at the 2020 Summer Olympics
Olympic cyclists of Poland
21st-century Polish people